Limonia nubeculosa, also known as the short-palped cranefly, is a species of crane flies in the family of Limoniidae.

Description
The wings have a dark pattern on their front edge. The legs (femurs) are coloured yellow and contain three dark rings.

They are found in forests in Europe. They are most common in Central Europe and fly from April to November.

References

Limoniidae
Insects described in 1804
Taxa named by Johann Wilhelm Meigen